Antonia Tarrago (1832-1916) was a Chilean feminist, activist and educator. She is known for her efforts to expand women's access to education in Chile.

Early life and death 

Antonia Tarrago was born in Chile in the year 1832. She was an educator and feminist activist most known for her efforts to expand education for women giving them the right to attend college. She died in 1916.

Career 
Antonia Tarrago founded the Santa Teresa school in Santiago de Chile in 1864 to give women the opportunity to attend high school and continue their education. Tarrago wanted women to further develop their intelligence and their psychological skills. Tarrago was motivated by her feeling that the level of education for women was scarce mainly because the Chilean government did not provide sufficient funds, as the Chilean society did not see women's education as important.  

In 1872, Tarrago attempted to gain the government’s approval for the recognition of high school exams in order for girl's to apply to the University of Chile. Her pursuits were unsuccessful at this time. There was mass controversy inside the government as to whether they wanted women to pursue higher education and to remain in the role of homemakers. However, in 1877 with the joint efforts of Isabel Le Brun another educator, they founded the “Colegio de la Recoleta,” a school for women and with the change of government, the efforts of Antonia Tarrago were victorious. 

On February 5, 1877, the Secretary of Justice and Public Education, Miguel Luis Amunátegui signed the decree that allowed women to attend college. The Amunátegui Decree declared that women should be allowed to present tests to be admitted for college, following the same dispositions established for men.

See also 
 The Amunátegui Decree

References

19th-century Chilean women
Chilean educators
Chilean women educators
Chilean feminists